The Oscar Lindsay House, at 7415 N. Main St. in Houston, Texas, was built around 1920.  It was listed on the National Register of Historic Places in 1997.

It is a one-story bungalow house located in the middle of the Independence Heights neighborhood.  It was deemed significant as "one of the most intact properties associated with an important businessman and city official of Independence Heights."  Oscar Lindsay served as city plumber.  He also operated a cleaning and pressing shop, a barber shop and an ice cream parlor business, with the latter in his front yard, taking advantage of its location on the busiest street.  The NRHP nomination was prepared by a member of the Independence Heights Neighborhood Council.

See also
Independence Heights Residential Historic District, also NRHP-listed

References

		
National Register of Historic Places in Harris County, Texas
Houses completed in 1920